Thomas Albert Bliss (born December 13, 1952) is an American motion picture producer and executive producer.  He is a founding partner at Strike Entertainment.

From 1984 to the present, Bliss has been credited with producing more than 30 productions (including The Hurricane and Air Force One)

Biography
Bliss attended UCLA Film School (1975), later returning to UCLA School of Law for law school (Juris Doctor, 1982).  He was admitted to The State Bar of California in 1983. Bliss is a graduate of Directors Guild of America Producers Training Plan.

Bliss is a member of the Board of Trustees of the Idyllwild Arts Foundation, the Board of Trustees of the Directors Guild of America – Alliance of Motion Picture and Television Producers Training Program, the Board of Trustees of California Indian Legal Services, and the Board of Trustees of the Fund for Wild Nature. He is a member of the Directors Guild of America and the Academy of Motion Picture Arts and Sciences.

Accolades 
Bliss has been honored with a Peabody Award, two CableACE Awards, and an American Red Cross Humanities Service Medal.

Select filmography
He was a producer in all films unless otherwise noted.

Film

Second unit director or assistant director

Production manager

Miscellaneous crew

Thanks

Television

Second unit director or assistant director

Production manager

References

External links

1952 births
Film producers from California
Living people
UCLA Film School alumni
UCLA School of Law alumni
People from Sherman Oaks, Los Angeles